Sister Dorothy Moore (born in 1933) is a Mi’kmaw educator, Indigenous Elder, Residential School survivor, and social justice activist. Moore was born in the Mi'kmaw community Membertou, Nova Scotia. She was the first Mi’kmaw person in a Roman Catholic order, entering the Sisters of St. Martha in 1954 and taking vows in 1956. Moore was an educator in the public elementary school system in Nova Scotia. She also taught at the University College of Cape Breton (UCCCB) and is noted as instrumental in the formation of their Mi'kmaw Studies program. Moore later became the Director of Mi'kmaq Services at the Nova Scotia Department of Education where she was instrumental in the development of the Mi'kmaw language program. She was awarded the Order of Canada on June 29, 2005 and has received numerous other awards including the Order of Nova Scotia, (2003) and three honorary degrees, including an honorary Doctor of Laws from St. Mary's University in Halifax. A collection of her talks, prayers, presentation, and ceremonies, entitled: A Journey of Love and Hope, was published by Nimbus Press in 2022. In 2022 a documentary film entitled Sister Dorothy Moore: A Life of Courage, Determination and Love was premiered at the Atlantic Film Festival in September, 2022.

References 

First Nations women
Mi'kmaq people
People from Cape Breton Island
Canadian educators
Members of the Order of Nova Scotia
Members of the Order of Canada
1933 births
Living people